On October 29, 2004, at 21:00 UTC, Al Jazeera broadcast excerpts allegedly from a videotape of Osama bin Laden addressing the people of the United States; in this video, he accepts responsibility for the September 11 attacks, condemns the Bush government's response to those attacks, and presents those attacks as part of a campaign of revenge and deterrence motivated by his witnessing of the destruction in the Lebanese Civil War in 1982. News analysts speculated that the release of the video was timed to influence the 2004 U.S. presidential election, which would take place four days later.

Content
The video is reported to be 18 minutes in length; bin Laden only speaks for 14 minutes 39 seconds. Al-Jazeera released a transcript of the complete tape on November 1, 2004.

Bin Laden appears wearing a turban and a white robe partially covered by a golden mantle, standing in front of an almost featureless brown background and reading his comments from papers resting on a podium. He moves both of his arms (dispelling rumors that one of them is limp after having been wounded) and looks healthy as far as can be told, but a bit older and greyer than in his former tapes. His remarks, in Arabic but addressed to citizens of the United States, instruct them that "the best way to avoid another Manhattan" (a reference to the September 11, 2001 attacks), is to not threaten the security of Muslim nations, such as Palestine and Lebanon.

He speaks of his desire to bankrupt the U.S., saying:

[It is] easy for us to provoke and bait this administration. All that we have to do is to send two mujahidin to the furthest point east to raise a piece of cloth on which is written al-Qaeda, in order to make the generals race there and cause America to suffer human, economic, and political losses. ... This is in addition to our having experience in using guerrilla warfare and the war of attrition to fight tyrannical superpowers, as we, alongside the mujahidin, bled Russia for 10 years, until it went bankrupt and was forced to withdraw in defeat.

He dismisses as rhetoric claims by U.S. President George W. Bush that the attacks occurred because Islamic extremists "hate freedom", saying: "If Bush says we hate freedom, let him tell us why we didn't attack Sweden, for example. It is known that freedom-haters don't have defiant spirits like those of the 19—may God have mercy on them".

Bin Laden further accuses U.S. President George W. Bush of misleading the American people during the previous three years—"Despite entering the fourth year after September 11, Bush is still deceiving you and hiding the truth from you and therefore the reasons are still there to repeat what happened"—as well as criticizing Bush's actions on the day of the attacks: "It never occurred to us that the Commander-in-Chief of the country would leave 50,000 citizens in the two towers to face those horrors alone because he thought listening to a child discussing her goats was more important."

Immediate reactions

George W. Bush said:
Let me make this very clear: Americans will not be intimidated or influenced by an enemy of our country. I'm sure Senator Kerry agrees with this. I also want to say to the American people that we're at war with these terrorists and I am confident that we will prevail.

Democratic presidential nominee Senator John Kerry said:
Let me make it clear, crystal clear: as Americans, we are absolutely united in our determination to hunt down and destroy Osama bin Laden and the terrorists. They are barbarians, and I will stop at absolutely nothing to hunt down, capture or kill the terrorists wherever they are, whatever it takes. Period.

Intelligence response

Even though Al Jazeera (when broadcasting the footage on its evening newscast) did not disclose the source of the video, sources within the United States intelligence community have confirmed that the speaker, who appears behind a lectern, is indeed bin Laden. By mentioning 2004 U.S. presidential candidate John Kerry by name, the tape seemed to prove that bin Laden was still alive at least midway through 2004, which was not known with certainty at the time.

According to the Agence France-Presse, U.S. diplomats in Qatar were given a copy of a videotape of Osama before it aired on al Jazeera television; the diplomats unsuccessfully sought to prevent the Arabic language network from broadcasting it. The United States State Department requested that the government of Qatar (where Al Jazeera is located) discourage the station from airing the videotape, according to a senior State Department official.

Even though the tape was analyzed by American intelligence to determine if it contains any coded messages to operatives, White House spokesman Scott McClellan commented that there were no plans to raise the U.S. terrorism alert level, as no specific threats were made in the tape.

According to Robert Parry, Ron Suskind noted that the CIA analysis of the video led them to the consensus view that the tape was designed strategically to help President Bush win reelection in 2004. Deputy CIA director John E. McLaughlin noted at one meeting, "Bin Laden certainly did a nice favor today for the President." Suskind quoted Jami Miscik, CIA deputy associate director for intelligence, as saying "Certainly, he would want Bush to keep doing what he's doing for a few more years." The same speculation has been made by Bahukutumbi Raman.

Public response
The 2004 tape boosted the popularity of George W. Bush. President Bush opened up a six-point lead over his opponent Senator John Kerry in the first opinion poll to include sampling taken after the videotape was broadcast. However, Kerry won the category of people who considered the tape "very important" 53% to 47% according to CNN's exit poll.

See also
 Videos and audio recordings of Osama bin Laden
 2007 Osama bin Laden video
 October surprise
 The One Percent Doctrine

References

Sources
 Complete Arabic text of 2004 Osama bin Laden videotape on al-Jazeera 
 Complete English translation text of 2004 Osama bin Laden videotape on Al-Jazeera
 Michael, Maggie. Bin Laden, in statement to U.S. people, says he ordered Sept. 11 attacks. The Associated Press. October 29, 2004.
 Excerpts from the BBC. October 29, 2004.

Al-Qaeda
Videos of Osama bin Laden
2004 United States presidential election
Aftermath of the September 11 attacks